The Rajputana Agency was a political office of the British Indian Empire dealing with a collection of native states in Rajputana (now in Rajasthan, northwestern India), under the political charge of an Agent reporting directly to the Governor-General of India and residing at Mount Abu in the Aravalli Range.

Subdivisions and (e)states 

 Mewar Residency, with headquarters at Udaipur, dealt with the state of Mewar (title Maharana of Udaipur), a salute state entitled to a hereditary gun salute of 19 guns (21 local).
 Southern Rajputana States Agency, which was part of Mewar Residency until 1906, when it was separated, covered three salute states:
 Banswara, title Maharawal, hereditary 15 guns
 Dungarpur, title Maharawal, hereditary 15 guns 
 Pratapgarh, title Maharawat, hereditary 15 guns
 Jaipur Residency, with headquarters at Jaipur, dealt with two salute states:
 Jaipur, title Majaraja, hereditary 17 guns (19 local)
 Kishangarh, title Majaraja, hereditary 15 guns
 as well as the Thikana (estate) of Lawa.
 Western Rajputana States Residency, with its headquarters at Jodhpur, dealt with: 
 Jodhpur, title Maharaja, hereditary salute of 17 guns (19 local)
 Jaisalmer, title Maharawal, hereditary salute of 15 guns
 Sirohi, title Maharao, hereditary salute of 15 guns
 Bikaner Agency, with headquarters at Bikaner, dealt with the salute state of Bikaner, title Maharaja, Hereditary salute of 17 guns (19 local)
 Alwar Agency, with headquarters at Alwar, dealt with the salute state of Alwar, title Maharaja, hereditary salute of 15 guns (17 local)
 Eastern Rajputana States Agency, with headquarters at Bharatpur, dealt with :
 Bharatpur, Jat, title Maharaja, hereditary salute of 17 guns (19 local)
 Karauli, title Maharaja, Hereditary salute of 17 guns
 Dholpur, Jat, title Maharaj Rana, hereditary salute of 15 guns (17 personal)
 Haraoti-Tonk Agency, with headquarters at Deoli, dealt with: 
 Bundi title Maharao, hereditary salute of 17 guns
 Tonk, Muslim, title Nawab, hereditary salute of 17 guns
 Shahpura, title Raja, hereditary salute of 9 guns.
 Kotah-Jhalawar Agency, with headquarters at Kota, dealt with: 
 Kota(h), title Maharaja, hereditary salute of 17 guns (19 personal) 
 Jhalawar, title Maharaj Rana, hereditary salute of 13 guns [15 Personal]

The small British province of Ajmer-Merwara was also included within the geographical area of Rajputana, but that was under direct British rule.

Population and dynasties 
All of the princely states had Hindu rulers, except Tonk, which had a Muslim ruler, most being Rajputs, except two in Eastern Rajputana, Bharatpur State and Dholpur State, which had Jat rulers. 
 
Although Rajputs ruled most of the states, they comprised a small minority of the population; in the 1901 census, of a total population of 9,723,301, only 620,229 were Rajputs, who were numerically strongest in the northern states and in Udaipur and Tarangagadh.

Other important castes and tribes of Rajputana were the Charans, known as poet-historians and administrators in princely states; the Brahmins, who traditionally performed priestly functions, and were numerous and influential; the Bhats, who were the keepers of secular tradition and of the genealogies; the Hindu mercantile castes; Jains, who comprised the majority of the merchants; the agricultural groups, such as the Jats and the Gurjars, the tribal peoples, Bhils, Meenas and Meo. In the 1901 census, 7,035,093 persons, or more than 72% of the total population spoke one of the Rajasthani languages.

Rulers 

Prior to the Muslim invasions of northern India in the eleventh century, Rajputana was ruled by a number of local dynasties, Chief of these were the Gurjara Pratiharas, who ruled at Kanauj; the Paramaras of Malwa; the Chauhans of Ajmer;The Bamraulia of Dholpur the Chaulukya (Solankis) of Anhilwara in Gujarat; the Guhilots with the Sisodia of Udaipur (Mewar); the Rathores of Marwar (Jodhpur); and the Kachwaha clan of Jaipur. The Rathore, Chauhan, Sisodia and Kachwahas ruled until Indian independence. These Rajput dynasties were gradually supplanted or subordinated by the Muslim invaders of the 11th century and weakened by internal feuds. At the beginning of the 16th century the Rajput power began to revive, only to be overthrown by the Babur, founder of the Mughal empire at Fatehpur Sikri in 1527. The clans were finally either conquered, overawed or conciliated by Akbar, except for the distant Sisodia clan, which, however, submitted to Jahangir in 1616. From Jahangir's accession to Aurangzeb's death in 1707, a period of 100 years, most of North India was under Mughal control although some states did rebel like Bundelas against Shah Jahan, Mewar and Marwar against Aurangzeb. In 16th century Jat Power Rise and they did battle against aurangzeb in battle of Tilpat, after the Death of Gokula Singh Raja Ram Jat looted Akbar's tomb and exhumed Akbar's bones and burned them. Aurangzeb's death, the invasion of the Marathas and Nader Shah of Iran led to a triple alliance among the three leading Rajput chiefs, which internal jealousy so weakened that the Marathas, having been called in by the Rathors to aid them, took possession of Ajmer about 1756. By the end of the century nearly the whole of Eastern Rajputana had been virtually subdued by the Marathas. The Second Anglo-Maratha War distracted the Marathas from 1807 to 1809, but afterwards Maratha domination of Rajputana resumed. In 1817 the British went to war with the Pindaris, raiders who were based in Maratha territory, which quickly became the Third Anglo-Maratha War, and the British government offered its protection to the Rajput rulers from the Pindaris and the Marathas. The Pindari were defeated, and the Afghan adventurer Amir Khan submitted and signed a treaty with the British, making him the ruler of Tonk. By the end of 1818 similar treaties had been executed between the other Rajput states and Britain. The Maratha Sindhia ruler of Gwalior gave up the district of Ajmer-Merwara to the British, and Maratha influence in Rajasthan came to an end. Most of the Jat and Rajput princes remained loyal to Britain in the Revolt of 1857, and few political changes were made in Rajputana until Indian independence in 1947.

Statistical overview

Economy 

In the time of the British Raj, the majority of the people were occupied in agriculture. In the large towns banking and commerce flourished. In the north, the staple products for export were salt, grain, wool and cotton, and in the south opium and cotton. The major imports included sugar, hardware and piece goods. Rajputana had relatively little industrial production. The principal manufactures were cotton and woolen goods, metalwork, ivory carving, and other handicrafts which were chiefly carried on in the eastern states. The system of agriculture was very simple; in the drier country west of the Aravalli Range only one crop was raised in the year, while in other parts south and east of the Aravallis two crops were raised annually, and various kinds of cereals, pulses and fibres are grown. In the desert tracts fine breeds of camels, cattle, horses and sheep were to be found wherever there is pasturage. Irrigation, mostly from wells, was almost confined to the northern portion. Rajputana was traversed throughout by the Rajputana railway, with its Malwa branch in the south, and diverging to Agra and Delhi in the north. Jodhpur, Udaipur and Bikaner had constructed branch railways at their own cost, the first of which was extended in 1901 to Hyderabad in Sindh. In 1909 another line was opened running north near the eastern boundary from Kotah to Bharatpur.

See also 
 Rajputana
 Maratha Empire
 British Raj

Notes

References 
 Imperial Gazetteer of India vol. IV (1907), The Indian Empire, Administrative, Published under the authority of His Majesty's Secretary of State for India in Council, Oxford at the Clarendon Press. Pp. xxx, 1 map, 552.

 
Agencies of British India
History of Rajasthan
1817 establishments in British India
1947 disestablishments in British India

sv:Rajputana